Romulea bulbocodium is one of the best-known species from the genus Romulea. The plant, a member of the family Iridaceae, is native to the Mediterranean region (southern Europe, northern Africa, the Middle East) and Sudan. It has many varieties and is occasionally used as ornamental plant.

The species has a small rootstock - a corm which can be found in sandy and rocky soils. It produces long and slender leaves. The plant looks much like the popular Crocus. It is in convergent evolution with it.

The blooms are small and with six tepals. Most varieties have purple or violet blooms, but white or yellow also occur.

The ovary is 3-locular and the seeds are brown, pellet-like, circular grains.

References

bulbocodium
Flora of Sudan
Garden plants
Flora of Malta